

Town of Sudbury 1893 - 1930

City of Sudbury 1930 - 2000

City of Greater Sudbury 2000 - Present
 2000
 2003
 2006
 2010